The Libramiento Felipe Carrillo Puerto is a toll highway bypassing the city of Felipe Carrillo Puerto, Quintana Roo. It is operated by a consortium of Banobras and Grupo Aldesa, which charges cars 24 pesos to drive the full length of the bypass. It is the only road signed as Mexican Federal Highway 307D.

History
The bypass opened on July 23, 2016, after four years of construction and an investment of 444 million pesos. The road is designed to reroute long-haul traffic, such as that from Cancún to Chetumal, away from the city itself. A full dedication by Governor Carlos Joaquín González took place in July 2017.

References

External links
Libramiento Carrillo

Mexican Federal Highways